Nicaria is a genus of moths of the family Crambidae. It contains only one species, Nicaria latisquamalis, which is found in Sulawesi.

References

Natural History Museum Lepidoptera genus database

Acentropinae
Crambidae genera